Free fatty acid receptor 2 (FFA2) is a G-protein coupled receptor encoded by the FFAR2 gene.

Expression
FFAR2 mRNA is expressed in adipose tissue, pancreas, spleen, lymph nodes, bone marrow, and peripheral blood mononuclear cells. FFAR2 transcription is regulated by the XBP1 transcription factor which binds to the core promoter.

Function 
Mouse studies utilizing Ffar2 gene deletions have implicated the receptor in the regulation of energy metabolism and immune responses. Short-chain fatty acids (SCFA's) generated in the processing of fiber by intestinal microbiota act as ligands for the receptor and can affect neutrophil chemotaxis. However, discrepancies between the pathways activated by FFAR2 agonists in human cells and the equivalent murine counterparts have been observed.

Heteromerization 
FFA2 may interact with FFAR3 to form a FFAR2-FFAR3 receptor heteromer with signalling that is distinct from the parent homomers.

See also 
 Free fatty acid receptor
Short-chain fatty acid

References

Further reading

External links 
 

G protein-coupled receptors